Richard Wilkinson may refer to:
 Richard G. Wilkinson (born 1943), researcher in the field of public health
 Richard Norton Wilkinson (died 1804), judge and political figure in Upper Canada
 Richard Denys Wilkinson, former British ambassador to Chile
 Richard Wilkinson (cricketer, born 1977), English former first-class cricketer
 Richard Wilkinson (cricketer, born 1982), English cricketer
 Richard H. Wilkinson (born 1951), American Egyptologist
 Richard James Wilkinson (1867–1941), colonial administrator, Malay scholar and historian
 Dick Wilkinson (1903–1976), Australian rules footballer